Senator Foley may refer to:

Brian X. Foley (born 1957), New York State Senate
Eileen Foley (1918–2016), New Hampshire State Senate
James A. Foley (1882–1946), New York State Senate
Leo Foley (1928–2016), Minnesota State Senate
Mark Foley (born 1954), Florida State Senate
Mike Foley (Nebraska politician) (born 1954), Nebraska State Senate
Samuel J. Foley (politician) (1862–1922), New York State Senate
William J. Foley (1887–1952), Massachusetts State Senate